Hohenau is a municipality in Bavaria, Germany.

Hohenau may also refer to:

Hohenau, Paraguay, a town in Paraguay
Hohenau an der March, a municipality in Lower Austria, Austria
Hohenau an der Raab, a municipality in Styria, Austria